is a Japanese animator and director known for directing The Prince of Tennis.

Career
Upon graduating high school, Takayuki Hamana joined Ajia-do as an in-between animator for four years. Hamana left Ajia-do and joined I.G Tatsunoko, where he became a key animator for various project such as Blue Seed (1994) and Jin-Roh (2000). His experience in storyboarding and directing an episode of Crayon Shin-chan became the "starting point" for his path to become a director. He made his series directing debut in 2001 with The Prince of Tennis and his film directing debut with The Prince of Tennis: Futari no Samurai (2005).

Works

Television series
Appleseed XIII: Director
Arte: Director
Hakkenden: Legend of the Dog Warriors: Key Animation (ep 10)
Idaten Jump: Director
Jin-Roh: The Wolf Brigade: Key Animation
Library War: Director, Storyboard (ep 1), Episode Director (ep 1)
Moshidora: Director
Mushibugyo: Director, Episode Director (eps 1, 13)
Sisters of Wellber: Director
Sisters of Wellber Zwei: Director
Sorcerous Stabber Orphen (2020): Director
Sorcerous Stabber Orphen: Battle of Kimluck: Director
Sorcerous Stabber Orphen: Chaos in Urbanrama: Director
The Beast Player Erin: Director
The Prince of Tennis: Director, Storyboard
Vampiyan Kids: Key Animation (pilot)

Films
Chocolate Underground: Director
Magical Girl Lyrical Nanoha Detonation: Director
Magical Girl Lyrical Nanoha Reflection: Director
Rakudai Majo: Director
The Prince of Tennis: Atobe Kara no Okurimono: Director, Storyboard, Key Animation
The Prince of Tennis: Futari no Samurai: Director, Storyboard, Unit Director
The Seven Deadly Sins: Cursed by Light: Director

References

External links

 Takayuki Hamana anime at Media Arts Database 

1967 births
Living people
Anime directors